The Avondale Heights Football Club is part of a community sports club that operates in the suburb of Avondale Heights. It is located 14 km north west of Melbourne. The sporting club offers its community an outlet to pursue Australian football as well as cricket and netball.

The football team plays in the Essendon District Football League.

History
The club was founded as a junior club in September 1965 where a small group of locals met at St James Church in Macey Street to establish a club for the youth of Avondale Heights.

The first side to represent the Avondale Heights in the Essendon District Football League was an Under 15 team in 1966. The average age of the team was 11 and it took six games for the first score, a behind, to be registered. The team managed five goals for the season. It was a tough time for the committee to get the players to away games.

In season 1967, the club fielded its first open age team with a Thirds side. By 1972, the number of junior teams had increased to five and a senior and reserve side.

The clubs first B Grade senior premiership was in 1976. After being promoted to A Grade in 1977, the club won their first A Grade premiership in 1987

Season 2001, saw the club relegated back to B Grade. This was on the back of severe financial losses that threaten the club's viability.

In 2004 the Seniors were Premiers and Champions of B Grade (undefeated). The club fields teams from under 10s through to open-age.

AFL players
 Matthew Lloyd – Captain & Coleman Medallist with Essendon- over 250 games
 Ken Mansfield – 48 games with Essendon 1976–1980
 Peter Baxter – 23 games with Footscray 1985–1988
 Brad Lloyd – 11 games with Hawthorn 1997–1999

Premierships

Senior
A Grade (1): 1987
B Grade (2): 1976, 2004
A3 Grade (2): 1980, 1984

Bibliography
 History of football in Melbourne's north west by John Stoward –

References

External links
 Official website
 AH Cricket club
 AH Netball club

Essendon District Football League clubs
1965 establishments in Australia
Australian rules football clubs established in 1965
Sport in the City of Moonee Valley
Australian rules football clubs in Melbourne